"Short Change Hero" is a song by English rock band the Heavy. It is the fifth track on their second studio album, The House That Dirt Built (2009). In 2012, the song peaked at number 109 on the French Singles Chart.

Release
"Short Change Hero" was not released as a single and was first featured on the fifth song on the Heavy's second studio album, The House That Dirt Built (2009). It was also featured in the soundtracks for the 2010 action film Faster and it was used as the theme song for Sky UK series Strike Back. It was also used for the soundtrack of the promotional trailer for the video game Batman: Arkham City, released in 2011 by Rocksteady. The song is notable for its usage as the theme song for the 2012 video game Borderlands 2. This song features in the VR game Pistol Whip in its Smoke and Thunder DLC. It was used during the final credits of the Season 3 finale to the Umbrella Academy on Netflix.

Chart performance
Despite not being released as a single, the song entered the French Singles Chart at number 162 on the week of 7 July 2012 and moved up to 109, its peak on that chart, during the next week. It reentered the chart at number 165 on the week of 29 June 2013, but exited the chart after that week.

Weekly charts

Certifications

References

2009 songs
The Heavy (band) songs